Eva Christensen is a former women's cricketer for the Denmark women's national cricket team who played three ODIs. She made her debut against the Netherlands in 1998, and played two matches during the 1999 Women's European Cricket Championship. She took her only international wickets in the 1999 match against England, while her highest score was made on her debut, when she scored 6 not out. In all, she scored 13 runs and took two wickets for Denmark.

References

Danish women cricketers
Denmark women One Day International cricketers
Living people
Year of birth missing (living people)